Rachabulda is a rural locality (a selo) in Karatinsky Selsoviet, Akhvakhsky District, Republic of Dagestan, Russia. The population was 167 as of 2010.

Geography 
Rachabulda is located 7 km northwest of Karata (the district's administrative centre) by road. Mashtada is the nearest rural locality.

References 

Rural localities in Akhvakhsky District